Tania Neill (née Reid) is a former association football player who represented New Zealand at international level.

Neill made her Football Ferns début in a 7–0 win over Trinidad and Tobago on 8 August 1993, and finished her international career with six caps to her credit.

References

Year of birth missing (living people)
Living people
New Zealand women's international footballers
New Zealand women's association footballers
Women's association footballers not categorized by position